Allen McIntyre Stack (January 23, 1928  – September 12, 1999) was an American competition swimmer, Olympic champion, and former world record-holder.

Stack won the gold medal in the men's 100-meter backstroke at the 1948 Summer Olympics in London.  Four years later at the 1952 Summer Olympics in Helsinki, Finland. He placed fourth in the final of the same event.

Stack attended Yale University, where he swam for the Yale Bulldogs swimming and diving team in National Collegiate Athletic Association (NCAA) competition from 1947 to 1949.  He graduated from Yale with a bachelor's degree in 1949.  He served in the U.S. Navy from 1951 to 1954, and graduated from Columbia University Law School in 1956.  He practiced law in Honolulu, Hawaii until 1998.

Stack was inducted into the International Swimming Hall of Fame as an "Honor Swimmer" in 1979.

See also
 List of members of the International Swimming Hall of Fame
 List of Olympic medalists in swimming (men)
 List of Yale University people
 World record progression 200 metres backstroke

References

External links
 
 

1928 births
1999 deaths
American male backstroke swimmers
Columbia Law School alumni
Deerfield Academy alumni
Hawaii lawyers
Olympic gold medalists for the United States in swimming
Pan American Games gold medalists for the United States
Sportspeople from New Haven, Connecticut
Swimmers at the 1948 Summer Olympics
Swimmers at the 1951 Pan American Games
Swimmers at the 1952 Summer Olympics
Yale Bulldogs men's swimmers
20th-century American lawyers
Medalists at the 1948 Summer Olympics
Pan American Games medalists in swimming
Medalists at the 1951 Pan American Games
20th-century American people